Fürstenberg is a municipality in the district of Holzminden, in Lower Saxony, Germany and lies on the Weser river in the Weser Uplands, near Höxter and Holzminden. The Fürstenberg China Factory, founded in 1747, is the third-oldest porcelain manufacturer in Germany.

References

Holzminden (district)